Roland Étienne (born 18 April 1944) is a French archaeologist and historian specialising in the history of Greek archaeology, ancient architecture and Hellenistic history.

Career 
A graduate of the École normale supérieure (1964–1969), Étienne taught ancient history in the Universities of Nanterre and Montpellier and conducted archaeological research in Greece (Cyclades) and Turkey.

He has lived five years in Greece with Françoise Étienne, from 1972 to 1976. Both have participated in excavations during this period. Together they authored  (collection "", 1990; English edition: The Search for Ancient Greece).

Professor of archaeology at Lumière University Lyon 2, he is the author of a dissertation on Tinos published in the collection  (1990).

In 1992, Étienne was appointed director of the French School at Athens.

Publications 
 under the direction of Roland Étienne, « Hyettos de Béotie et chronologie des archontes fédéraux entre 250 et 171 avant J.-C. », in Bulletin de correspondance hellénique (BCH), 1976, Supplément 3
 with Denis Knoepfler, Hyettos de Béotie et la chronologie des archontes fédéraux entre 250 et 171 avant J.-C. with an appendix by John Fossey, Éditions de Boccard (collection Bulletin de laCorrespondance Hellénique supplément III), Paris, 1976 compte-rendu de Marcel Piérart, in L'Antiquité Classique, 1978, tome 47, 
 Inscriptions de Délos, in Bulletin de Correspondance Hellénique (BCH), 1981, tome 105, 
 with Jean-Pierre Braun, Ténos I. Le Sanctuaire de Poseidon et d'Amphitrite, 3 volumes, Éditions De Boccard (collection Bibliothèques des Écoles Françaises d'Athènes et de Rome, fascicule 263), Paris, 1986 (compte-rendu de Jean Marcadé, dans Revue des Études Anciennes, 1988, tome 90, 
 with Philippe Fraisse, L'autel archaïque de l'Artémision de Délos, in Bulletin de Correspondance Hellénique (BCH), 1989, tome 113, 
 Ténos II. Ténos et les Cyclades du milieu du IVe siècle avant J.-C. au milieu du IIIe siècle après J.-C., Éditions De Boccard (collection Bibliothèques des Écoles Françaises d'Athènes et de Rome, fascicule 263bis), Paris, 1990,  ; 293p. (compte-rendu Michel Amandry, dans Revue Numismatique, 1992, tome 34, 
 L'oracle d'Apollon à Claros Une consultation à Claros en 18 av. J.C., in Publications de l'Institut Français d'Études Anatoliennes, 1990, 

 with Françoise Étienne, La Grèce antique : Archéologie d'une découverte, collection « Découvertes Gallimard » (nº 84), série Archéologie. Gallimard, Paris, 1990,  ; 176pp.
 UK edition – The Search for Ancient Greece, ‘New Horizons’ series. Thames & Hudson, 1992
 US edition – The Search for Ancient Greece, "Abrams Discoveries" series. Harry N. Abrams, 1992
 with Jean-Pierre Braun, L'autel monumental du théâtre à Délos, dans Bulletin de Correspondance Hellénique (BCH), 1995, tome 119, 
 L'École française d'Athènes, 1846-1996, dans Bulletin de Correspondance Hellénique (BCH), 1996, 
 L'espace grec. 150 ans de fouilles de l'école française d'Athènes, Fayard, Paris, 1996,  ; 190pp.
 Le Prytanée de Délos, dans Revue des Études Anciennes, 1997, tome 99, 
 Athènes, espaces urbains et histoire. Des origines à la fin du IIIe siècle après J.-C., Hachette (collection Carré Histoire), Paris, 2004,  ; 255pp.
 with Pierre Varène, Sanctuaire de Claros. Les propylées et les monuments de la voie sacrée. Douilles de Louis et Jeanne Robert et Roland Martin, 1950-1961, 2006  ; 279pp.
 with Cristel Müller et Francis Prost, Archéologie historique de la Grèce Antique, Ellipses, Paris, 2006,  ; 399pp.
 Le Sanctuaire d’Apollon, in Bulletin de Correspondance Hellénique (BCH), 2009, tome 133, 
 with Jean-François Salles, « Iraq al-Amīr. Guide historique et archéologique du domaine des Tobiades », Presses de l'Institut français du Proche Orient, 2010, 
 , Centre Culturel de Tinos, 2014,  ; 184pp.

References 

1944 births
French archaeologists
French hellenists
20th-century French non-fiction writers
20th-century French historians
21st-century French historians
École Normale Supérieure alumni
Living people